The Canadian Triple Tiara of Thoroughbred Racing is a series of Canadian Thoroughbred horse races for Canadian-foaled three-year-old fillies inaugurated in 1999. The races consists of the:

 Woodbine Oaks
 Bison City Stakes
 Wonder Where Stakes

Since 1965, only fillies have run in these races.

In 2007, Sealy Hill became the first filly to win the Canadian Triple Tiara.

Canadian Triple Tiara winners

Horse races in Canada
Racing series for horses
1999 establishments in Ontario